Alan Noble may refer to:

Alan Noble (entrepreneur)
Alan Noble (field hockey)
 Alan Noble (footballer)